Lance Voorjans (born 26 December 1990) is a Dutch footballer who plays as a midfielder for Belgian Division 2 club Tongeren.

Career
Born in Maastricht, Voorjans started his career as a youth prospect of the city's main club, MVV. After being released by the club in the 2013–14 season, he moved to German Regionalliga side KFC Uerdingen 05. Voorjans played for lower-tier Belgian club Spouwen-Mopertingen from 2014 to 2017 and then joined Bocholter VV. In 2018, he moved to Hades Hasselt, before returning to Spouwen-Mopertingen in 2020, which was renamed Belisia Bilzen the following year. In 2022, he moved to Tongeren.

After football
Besides playing football on amateur level since 2014, Voorjans has worked for industrial engineering company Flexprof in Maastricht together with fellow former MVV player Lloyd Borgers.

References

External links
 Voetbal International

1990 births
Living people
Dutch footballers
MVV Maastricht players
Eerste Divisie players
Footballers from Maastricht
Association football midfielders
Dutch expatriate footballers
Expatriate footballers in Germany
Expatriate footballers in Belgium
Dutch expatriate sportspeople in Germany
Dutch expatriate sportspeople in Belgium
Regionalliga players
KFC Uerdingen 05 players
K.S.K. Tongeren players